Baltimore Leadership School for Young Women (BLSYW, pronounced "Bliss") is a public charter middle and high school for girls in Mount Vernon, Baltimore, Maryland. It is the first public all girls' secondary school in the city that had both middle and senior high school levels.

History
Founded by philanthropist and women's rights advocate Brenda Brown Rever, it opened in 2009 with 120 students. It initially only served 6th graders, and was located on the third floor of the Western High School building. The people of Western High School opposed the idea of BLSYW being housed in that building. In 2010 BLSYW moved into its permanent campus, the former headquarters of the Greater Baltimore Young Women's Christian Association (YWCA) in Mount Vernon, making it the first newly established public school in that area in a three decade period.

In June 2016 the school's first 12th grade class, made up of 60 students, graduated.

In 2017 director Amanda Lipitz released Step, a documentary about three students from the school who participate in a step dance competition. Bloomberg Philanthropies and the Baltimore Ravens contributed to the film's financing. Fox Searchlight Pictures received worldwide distribution rights for the film.

Management
 the head of the Enoch Pratt Free Library, Carla Hayden, is on the board of directors of BLSYW.

Demographics
In 2016, 59 of the girls in the 12th grade class were low income African-Americans.

References

External links
 Baltimore Leadership School for Young Women
 BLSYW at Baltimore City Schools

Girls' schools in Maryland
Public schools in Baltimore
Charter schools in Maryland
2009 establishments in Maryland
Educational institutions established in 2009
Public middle schools in Maryland
Public high schools in Maryland